Araira is a town in the state of Miranda, Venezuela. A town west of Guatire. The city is 52 kilometers (32 miles) from Caracas.

History 
The city was founded in 1864. It already existed as a populated nucleus since the mid -seventeenth century.

Populated places in Miranda (state)